Trex may refer to:

 Tyrannosaurus rex, a large species of therapod dinosaur from the late Cretaceous
 Trex Company, a composite decking manufacturer
 TREX Regional Exchanges Oy (IXP), an Internet Exchange Point in Finland
 Trex (card game) a card game
 TREX search engine, a search engine in SAP NetWeaver
 TREX (Tree Regular Expressions for XML), a subset of Regular Language description for XML
 The proteins TREX1 and TREX2

See also 
 T. rex (disambiguation)